Ashby may refer to:

People
 Ashby (surname)
 Alan la Zouche, 1st Baron la Zouche of Ashby (1267–1314), governor of Rockingham Castle and steward of Rockingham Forest, England
 Walter Ashby Plecker (1861–1947), American physician and public health advocate 
 Henry Ashby Turner (born 1932), American historian of Germany
 Ashby Pate (born 1978), American lawyer

Places

Australia
 Ashby, Victoria
 Ashby, Western Australia

United Kingdom
 Ashby, Lincolnshire
 Ashby, Suffolk
 Ashby with Oby, Norfolk
 Ashby by Partney, Lincolnshire
 Ashby cum Fenby, Lincolnshire
 Ashby de la Launde, Lincolnshire
 Ashby-de-la-Zouch, Leicestershire
 Ashby Folville, Leicestershire
 Ashby Magna, Leicestershire
 Ashby Parva, Leicestershire
 Ashby Puerorum, Lincolnshire
 Ashby St Ledgers, Northamptonshire
 Ashby St Mary, Norfolk
 Canons Ashby, Northamptonshire
 Castle Ashby, Northamptonshire
 Cold Ashby, Northamptonshire
 Mears Ashby, Northamptonshire
 West Ashby, Lincolnshire

United States
Ashby, Massachusetts
Ashby, Minnesota
Ashby, Nebraska
Ashby, Cumberland County, Virginia
Ashby, Warren County, Virginia

Buildings
Ashby (BART station), a passenger rail station in Berkeley, California
Ashby (MARTA station), a passenger rail station in Atlanta, Georgia
Ashby Manor Historic District, listed on the National Register of Historic Places in Iowa
Ashby (Ladoga, Indiana), listed on the National Register of Historic Places in Indiana

Other uses
 Ashby, a novel by Pierre Guyotat
 Material selection#Ashby plots, a diagram with chemical elements 
 Ashby (film), a 2015 drama film starring Mickey Rourke
 Ashby (automobile), an English cyclecar manufactured 1919–1924

See also 
 Ashbee, surname